Possum Walk Hotel is a historic hotel building located near Burlington Junction, Nodaway County, Missouri. It was  built between 1873 and 1875, and is a two-story, Italianate style "L"-plan brick building.  It features a long shed roof porch on the facade of the ell extension and a small porch with balcony at the main entrance.

It was listed on the National Register of Historic Places in 1983.

References

Hotel buildings on the National Register of Historic Places in Missouri
Italianate architecture in Missouri
Hotel buildings completed in 1875
Buildings and structures in Nodaway County, Missouri
National Register of Historic Places in Nodaway County, Missouri